Frost God is the second mixtape by Swedish rapper Yung Lean. It was released on December 14, 2016 by YEAR0001. The album was released digitally on iTunes, Apple Music, and Spotify without prior announcement or promotion.

On November 25, 2016, a video was released for the song Hennessy & Sailor Moon, directed by Léo Siboni.

Background
In a 2020 interview, Yung Lean stated that he felt the album was a "compilation in a way". That year, Yung Lean recorded much music while touring to promote his album Warlord.

Critical reception 
The Observer felt that the album was a retreat of the "chilly synths and affectless monotone in torpid, ever-decreasing circles without even the sparks of energy that livened up this year’s Warlord album".

Track listing

References

External links
 

2016 mixtape albums
Yung Lean albums
Year0001 albums